Kurdish may refer to:

Kurds or Kurdish people
Kurdish languages
Kurdish alphabets
Kurdistan, the land of the Kurdish people which includes:
Southern Kurdistan
Eastern Kurdistan
Northern Kurdistan
Western Kurdistan

See also
 Kurd (disambiguation)
Kurdish literature
Kurdish music
Kurdish rugs
Kurdish cuisine
Kurdish culture
Kurdish nationalism

Language and nationality disambiguation pages